Sevendys is a collaborative musical project featuring rock musicians of several generations.  The quintet of Jed Davis (keyboards/vocals), Avi Zahner-Isenberg (guitars/vocals), Sheridan Riley (drums/vocals), Chuck Rainey (bass) and Jerry Marotta (percussion/vocals) has recorded a dozen songs over three recording sessions since forming in 2010.

Sevendys' first single, "So So Close"/"When I Step Off The Train", was released in 2011 on limited-edition signed and numbered red vinyl by JAXART.

External links 
Sevendys official Web site

References

American musical groups
Musical groups established in 2010
2010 establishments in the United States